Rahelty, sometimes written Rahealty, may refer to:

Places in County Tipperary, Ireland
Rahelty (civil parish), in County Tipperary  
Rahelty (townland), a townland in the above parish
Rahelty (electoral division)

Places in County Kilkenny, Ireland
Rahelty, County Kilkenny, a townland in County Kilkenny